{{DISPLAYTITLE:C2H4S2}}
The molecular formula C2H4S2 (molar mass: 92.18 g/mol, exact mass: 91.97544 u) may refer to:

 Isomers of dithietane
 1,2-Dithietane
 1,3-Dithietane